George Frederick Martin (born 18 June 2001) is an English professional rugby union player who plays for Leicester Tigers in Premiership Rugby. His preferred position is lock, but he also plays back row.  He was a Premiership Rugby champion in 2022.

Early life
Martin attended Rawlins Academy in Quorn, Leicestershire where he was selected for England's under-16 rugby union team. He then attended Brooksby Melton College where he was selected for England's under-18 side. He scored a try against France under-18 during their 2018 summer tour of South Africa and in April 2019 captained at the under-18 Six Nations Festival.

Martin was part of Leicester Tigers two successive under 18 league titles.

Career
In July 2019 Martin signed his first professional contract for Leicester Tigers. On 21 September 2019 Martin made his first team debut for Leicester in a Premiership Rugby Cup fixture against Worcester Warriors.  On 7 July 2020 he signed a new contract with Leicester.

On 1 January 2021 Martin was selected for England under-20s squad for the 2021 U20 Six Nations, then on 22 January 2021 he was named in Eddie Jones' "Shadow squad" for the senior 2021 Six Nations Championship. He was named as a "finisher" for the England match against Wales, but was not used.

On 20 March 2021 he made his England debut against Ireland, coming on as a replacement for Billy Vunipola in the 64th minute in a 32-18 defeat.

Martin was named as BT Sport's man of the match for Leicester's win against Newcastle Falcons in the 2020-21 European Rugby Challenge Cup quarter-finals, and then again after the opening game of the 2021-22 Premiership Rugby season, a 34-19 victory over Exeter Chiefs. He ended the season playing in the final as a replacement and making the penultimate carry before Freddie Burns' 80th minute drop goal which won the match.

On 28 September 2022 Martin extended his contract at Leicester.

References

2001 births
Living people
English rugby union players
England international rugby union players
Leicester Tigers players
Rugby union locks
Rugby union players from Nottingham